In enzymology, a methionine-glyoxylate transaminase is an enzyme that catalyzes the chemical reaction

L-methionine + glyoxylate  4-methylthio-2-oxobutanoate + glycine

Thus, the two substrates of this enzyme are L-methionine and glyoxylate, whereas its two products are 4-methylthio-2-oxobutanoate and glycine.

This enzyme belongs to the family of transferases, specifically the transaminases, which transfer nitrogenous groups.  The systematic name of this enzyme class is L-methionine:glyoxylate aminotransferase. Other names in common use include methionine-glyoxylate aminotransferase, and MGAT.

References

Further reading 

 

EC 2.6.1
Enzymes of unknown structure